Helen Beck may refer to:
 Sally Rand, dancer, née Helen Gould Beck
 Violet Hélène Beck, wife of Peter Cushing